Chestnuthill Township is a township in Monroe County, Pennsylvania, United States. The population was 16,708 at the 2020 census.

Geography

Demographics

As of the census of 2000, there were 14,418 people, 4,906 households, and 3,905 families residing in the township. The population density was 384.9 people per square mile (148.6/km2). There were 5,593 housing units at an average density of 149.3/sq mi (57.7/km2). The racial makeup of the township was 92.34% White, 4.06% African American, 0.13% Native American, 1.00% Asian, 0.02% Pacific Islander, 1.03% from other races, and 1.41% from two or more races. Hispanic or Latino of any race were 4.88% of the population.

There were 4,906 households, out of which 42.4% had children under the age of 18 living with them, 67.9% were married couples living together, 7.5% had a female householder with no husband present, and 20.4% were non-families. 16.1% of all households were made up of individuals, and 6.7% had someone living alone who was 65 years of age or older. The average household size was 2.91 and the average family size was 3.26.

In the township the population was spread out, with 29.8% under the age of 18, 6.6% from 18 to 24, 29.7% from 25 to 44, 22.7% from 45 to 64, and 11.3% who were 65 years of age or older. The median age was 37 years. For every 100 females, there were 99.8 males. For every 100 females age 18 and over, there were 96.6 males.

The median income for a household in the township was $50,210, and the median income for a family was $55,058. Males had a median income of $41,988 versus $25,363 for females. The per capita income for the township was $20,017. About 5.9% of families and 7.9% of the population were below the poverty line, including 9.2% of those under age 18 and 6.6% of those age 65 or over.

Emergency Services
West End Fire Company provides fire suppression, technical rescue, and hazardous material operations level response in addition to other tasks for all of Chestnuthill Township and provides mutual aid to the surrounding Townships. 
Emergency Medical Services are provided by West End Community Ambulance Association.
Police services are provided by the Pennsylvania State Police.

Climate

According to the Trewartha climate classification system, Chestnuthill Township has a Temperate Continental climate (Dc) with warm summers (b), cold winters (o) and year-around precipitation (Dcbo). Dcbo climates are characterized by at least one month having an average mean temperature ≤ , four to seven months with an average mean temperature ≥ , all months with an average mean temperature <  and no significant precipitation difference between seasons. Although most summer days are slightly humid in Chestnuthill Township, episodes of heat and high humidity can occur with heat index values > . July is the peak month for thunderstorm activity, which correlates with the average warmest month of the year. The average wettest month is September, which correlates with tropical storm remnants during the peak of the Atlantic hurricane season. Since 1981, the wettest calendar day has been 6.35 inches (161 mm), on September 30, 2010. Since 1981, the coldest air temperature has been  on January 21, 1994. Episodes of extreme cold and wind can occur, with wind chill values < . The average snowiest month is January which correlates with the average coldest month of the year. Ice storms and large snowstorms depositing ≥ 12 inches (30 cm) of snow occur once every couple of years, particularly during nor’easters from December through March.

Transportation

U.S. Route 209, Pennsylvania Route 115 and Pennsylvania Route 715 are the numbered highways serving Chestnuthill Township. US 209 follows a southwest-northeast alignment across the southern portion of the township. PA 115 begins at US 209 and heads northwestward across the southern and western portions of the township. PA 715 also begins at US 209 and heads northward across southern and eastern parts of the township.

Ecology

According to the A. W. Kuchler U.S. potential natural vegetation types, Chestnuthill Township would have a dominant vegetation type of Appalachian Oak (104) with a dominant vegetation form of Eastern Hardwood Forest (25). The peak spring bloom typically occurs in late-April and peak fall color usually occurs in mid-October.

References

External links

Chestnuthill Township
Chestnuthill Info

Populated places established in 1763
Townships in Monroe County, Pennsylvania
Townships in Pennsylvania